Romeu Evangelista (born 27 March 1950), also known as Romeu Cambalhota, is a retired Brazilian footballer who spent most of his career with Clube Atlético Mineiro and Corinthians.

International career
All of Romeu Evangelista's caps and only goal came in the 1975 Copa América, where he helped Brazil to third place.

Career statistics

International

International goals
Scores and results list Brazil's goal tally first.

References

External links
 

1950 births
Living people
Brazilian footballers
Brazilian expatriate footballers
Brazil international footballers
Association football midfielders
Categoría Primera A players
Clube Atlético Mineiro players
Sport Club Corinthians Paulista players
Sociedade Esportiva Palmeiras players
Nacional Atlético Clube (SP) players
Brazilian expatriate sportspeople in Colombia
Expatriate footballers in Colombia